The Mato Grosso blind snake (Siagonodon cupinensis) is a species of snake in the family Leptotyphlopidae. The species is native to northeastern South America.

Geographic range
S. cupinensis is found in the Brazilian states of Amapá, Mato Grosso, and Pará, and in Suriname.

Habitat
The preferred natural habitat of S. cupinensis is savanna.

Description
S. cupinensis is uniformly yellowish, not striped. It has on average 270 middorsal scales from rostral to tail tip.

Reproduction
S. cupinensis is oviparous.

References

Further reading
Adalsteinsson SA, Branch WR, Trape S, Vitt LJ, Hedges SB (2009). "Molecular phylogeny, classification, and biogeography of snakes of the family Leptotyphlopidae (Reptilia, Squamata)". Zootaxa 2244: 1–50. (Siagonodon cupinensis, new combination).
Bailey JR, Carvalho AL (1946). "A new Leptotyphlops from Mato Grosso, with notes on Leptotyphlops tenella Klauber". Boletim do Museu Nacional do Brazil, Rio de Janeiro, Nova Série, Zoologia 52: 1–7. (Leptotyphlops cupinensis, new species).
Francisco BCS, Pinto RR, Fernandes DS (2018). "Taxonomic Notes on the Genus Siagonodon Peters, 1881, with a Report on Morphological Variation in Siagonodon cupinensis (Bailey and Carvalho, 1946) (Serpentes: Leptotyphlopidae)". Copeia 106 (2): 321–328. 

Siagonodon
Taxa named by Antenor Leitão de Carvalho
Reptiles described in 1946